Our Lady of La Salette is a Marian apparition reported by two French children, Maximin Giraud and Mélanie Calvat, to have occurred at La Salette-Fallavaux, France, in 1846.

On 19 September 1851, the local bishop formally approved the public devotion and prayers to Our Lady of La Salette. On 21 August 1879, Pope Leo XIII granted a canonical coronation to the image now located within the Basilica of Our Lady of La Salette. A Russian-style tiara was granted to the image, instead of the solar-type tiara used in the traditional depictions of Our Lady during her apparitions.

Places dedicated to Our Lady of La Salette outside of France include a sanctuary in Oliveira de Azeméis, in Portugal, a chapel in San Miguel de Allende, Guanajuato, in México, a shrine in Kodaikanal, Tamilnadu, India, as well as a national shrine in Attleboro, Massachusetts, and a shrine in Enfield, New Hampshire, in the United States, both known for their displays of Christmas lights.

History

In 1846 the village of La Salette consisted of eight or nine scattered hamlets. The population was about 800, principally small farmers with their families and dependents.

The apparition 

On Saturday, September 19, 1846, around 3 p.m., two young shepherds, Mélanie Mathieu (or Mélanie Calvat), aged just under fifteen, and Maximin Giraud (sometimes called Mémin, and, by mistake, Germain), eleven years old, guarded their herds on a mountain near the village of La Salette-Fallavaux (department of Isère). On the evening, they said to their masters that they had seen a lady in tears who had spoken to them. Widow Pra (also known as widow Caron), mistress of Mélanie, thought that they had seen the Blessed Virgin and the children were urged to tell the priest of La Salette everything. They did it the next day, Sunday morning. The priest wept with emotion, took notes and, again in tears, spoke of the fact in his sermon.

The Pra report 

On Sunday evening, in the presence of Mélanie but in the absence of Maximin, whom his master has taken back to his family in Corps, Baptiste Pra (Mélanie's master), Pierre Selme (Maximin's master) and a certain Jean Moussier collaborate to put in writing the words addressed by the Virgin to the children. The resulting document, which is called the "Pra report", is now only known from a copy made by an investigator, Abbé Lagier, in February 1847. Nevertheless, this copy agrees with earlier documents which surely derive from the original Pra report. Lagier's copy reads as follows:

According to later reports, the words "I will tell you otherwise" mean that the Virgin, who had first spoken in French, began to speak in the patois of Corps. From 12 October 1846 the documents mention that during the apparition, the lady confided a personal secret to each of the two children.

For Father Stern, the Pra report is of prime importance among the documents on the apparition.

Process of harmonization between the testimonies of the two children 

As said above, the Pra report was written in the presence of Mélanie and in the absence of Maximin. Father Stern, however, considers it possible that the writers of the report added to Mélanie's statements things that had been said by Maximin.

Indeed, each of the two seers had, in the first weeks, a part of the lady's message of which he was more sure than the other seer. The parish priest of La Salette noted on 16 October 1846: "All this story" (that is to say, essentially, what concerns the complaints, threats and promises of the Virgin) "is faithfully given by little Mélanie and although little Germain could not in principle give it with the same order, he always said, however, when hearing his little companion tell it, that it was indeed that. What follows" (that is to say, essentially, the account of the Coin incident, which features Maximin and his father ) "was more particularly understood and remembered by little Germain, Mélanie admitting that it is certain that the lady spoke to the little boy without Mélanie being able to understand the lady."

However, in the words of Father Stern, a "process of harmonization" between the statements of the two children resulted in the fixation of the "Salettine vulgate": "The way he (Maximin) presents the words of the Lady (. ..) in February–March 1847 certainly owes something to the stories he heard from Mélanie in the meantime. But an influence in the opposite direction, from Maximin to Mélanie, must also have existed."

Episcopal inquiries 

The story of Mélanie and Maximin was very well received by the population and, at least from November 1846, the bishop of Grenoble, Philibert de Bruillard, was convinced of the reality of the apparition, but, wishing to be able to support his judgment on indisputable evidence, he requested several reports from various commissions.

The Ars Incident 

In September 1850, Maximin, who was advised by some to become Marist, wanted to consult the Curé d'Ars about his vocation. Brayer, benefactor of the two seers, and Verrier, one of the partisans of the "Baron de Richemont" who hoped that the secret of La Salette related to the destinies of this alleged Louis XVII, undertook to take Maximin to the famous priest. Maximin's guardian officially gave his consent, but the bishop of Grenoble opposed the trip. Maximin, stamping with vexation, refused to submit to this prohibition. Brayer and Verrier disregarded the will of the bishop and took Maximin to Ars accompanied by his sister Angélique, who was an adult.

The group arrives in Ars on 24 September in the evening. He is received by the Abbé Raymond, vicar of Ars, who expresses to Maximin a total incredulity with regard to the apparition of La Salette. The next morning, Maximin has a one-on-one interview with the Curé of Ars. After this interview, the priest, who until then had great confidence in the apparition of La Salette, declares to several people, in particular to ecclesiastics, that Maximin retracted. One of these ecclesiastics informs the episcopal commission in charge of investigating the apparition and Abbé Gerin, a member of this commission, comes at the end of October to hear the Curé of Ars.

Maximin is questioned about the Ars incident at the minor seminary of Grenoble and at the bishopric. On 2 November, he attested in writing, at the minor seminary, that the Curé of Ars had not questioned him either about the apparition of La Salette or about his secret and that, for his part, in his answers to the parish priest and the vicar of Ars, he said nothing that was contrary to what he had said to thousands of others since the apparition. The same day, he declared before a special commission meeting at the bishopric that he had not retracted in Ars, but that, not hearing the priest distinctly, he sometimes said yes and no at random. "This is at least how Rousselot presents his explanations" adds Father Stern. (Canon Rousselot considered himself the postulator of the cause of La Salette.) On November 8, Father Mélin, parish priest of Corps, and Canon Rousselot went to Ars. The Curé of Ars told them that Maximin confessed to him "that he had seen nothing and had lied when making his known story and had persisted in this lie for three years as he saw the good effects of it". On November 21, Maximin wrote ("one made him write", says Father Stern) a letter to the Curé of Ars in which he gave the following explanation: "Allow me to tell you in all sincerity , that there has been a complete misunderstanding on your part. I did not want to tell you, Father, and I never said seriously to anyone, that I had seen nothing and had lied by making my known story and had persisted in this lie for three years. as I saw the good effects of it. I only told you, Father, when I left the sacristy and on the door, that I saw something and that I didn't know if it was the Blessed Virgin or another lady. At this moment you were advancing through the crowd and our conversation ceased." According to Father Stern, the least that can be said of Maximin's various explanations is that they lack coherence. (Later, in 1865, Maximin would give yet another explanation: the lie he had confessed to the Curé of Ars did not concern the apparition, but a theft of cherries he had committed in road to Ars. "As if, remarks Father Stern, cherries grew in September!")

Bishop de Bruillard tended however to believe in the sincerity of Maximin's explanation by the misunderstanding. He supported this explanation in a letter he wrote to the Curé of Ars, as he forwarded to him that of Maximin: "During the recent visit to you by Canon Rousselot and M. Mélin, Pastor-Archpriest of Corps, you told these Gentlemen that Maximin had confessed to you 'that he had seen nothing and had lied in making his known story and had persisted in this lie for three years as he saw the good effects of it'. (...) Finally, you said to MM. Rousselot and Mélin that as a result of this interview with Maximin, you could no longer believe in the apparition of La Salette as before, and that you no longer believed in it. MM. Mélin and Rousselot told me all these things with a common voice. Now, such a change of opinion on your part, M. le Curé, which is more and more known, (for the very sake of the salvation of souls,) would be a very serious fact if the apparition is real, as believed nine bishops whom I consulted. If you misheard Maximin, as he affirms with all appearances of sincerity, in the judgment of several people who have my confidence, affirmation written in the attached document that the child addresses you very resolutely, you cannot exempt you from examining again, and you will not refuse to inform me of the result of this examination and of the opinion to which it may lead you. You understand, M. le Curé, that having encouraged the belief of the people in the apparition of La Salette, by the approval I gave to the publication of the reports drawn up by my order on this affair, you cannot put yourself in a kind of public opposition with me, without having the kindness to inform me of your reasons, since I have the honor to request them from you insistently."

In his answer, the Curé of Ars did not adopt the explanation based on the misunderstanding that the Bishop of Grenoble suggested to him. On the question of fact, he stood by his statements to the parish priest of Corps and to Canon Rousselot, but he did not exclude that the apparition could be authentic despite Maximin's categorical retraction: "It is not necessary to repeat to Your Highness what I said to these Gentlemen. The boy having told me that he had not seen the Blessed Virgin, I was tired of it for a couple of days. After all, Monseigneur, the wound is not so great, and if this fact is the work of God, man will not destroy it. » This response of the Curé of Ars did not trouble Bishop de Bruillard. For him, it was not possible that the children invented all the circumstances of the apparition, so either there was a misunderstanding between the Curé d'Ars and Maximin, or it was not seriously that Maximin said he had seen nothing.

The Curé of Ars, as for him, continued to maintain that Maximin had really retracted. Abbé Alfred Monnin, who entered the entourage of the Curé of Ars as a missionary, reported as follows an interview he had with him in the presence of a few people:

This passage from the book of Abbé Alfred Monnin disappeared from some later editions, but there are other testimonies in the same sense.

Father Stern notes that the Curé of Ars had very good hearing and was neither stupid nor stubborn: "If there had been the possibility of a misunderstanding on his part, why would he have had difficulty to admit it, he who asked nothing better than to believe?" Therefore Father Stern adopts, with other authors favorable to the authenticity of the apparition, an explanation different from those that Maximin himself gave in 1850: Maximin would have voluntarily fooled the Curé of Ars. According to one of the partisans of this thesis of a hoax from Maximin, the vicar of Ars had affirmed before Maximin that the priest read consciences and Maximin would have liked to put the priest to the test. Father Stern, for his part, does not consider it necessary to make the vicar of Ars play an important role: Maximin was surrounded by naive people to whom he liked to tell balderdash and when these naive people spoke to him about the extraordinary priest of Ars, he behaved towards him as towards the others.

The Curé of Ars, whom the affair has plunged into desolation, will confide to his auxiliary Catherine Lassagne, years after the recognition of the apparition by the bishop of Grenoble, that he is very annoyed not to believe in it. He will end up recovering his faith in La Salette for reasons, one of which is purely subjective (deliverance from an inner pain) and the other of which (attribution of a miraculous cause to a help arriving during financial difficulties) is of a degree of objectivity that varies according to the witnesses.

The 1851 episcopal letter and the persistence of the opposition 

In an episcopal letter which is dated September 19, 1851 (fifth anniversary of the apparition), but which, at the bishopric, is classified among the November texts, Bishop de Bruillard declared the apparition authentic and authorized the cult of Our Lady of La Salette. This act weakened the opposition without making it disappear and its leaders, taking advantage in 1852 of the arrival of a new bishop (Mgr Ginoulhiac, replacing Mgr de Bruillard who had resigned), violently attacked the reality of the miracle of the Salette. Two ecclesiastics, Abbé Deléon and Cartellier, parish priest of the Saint-Joseph church in Grenoble, even claimed that the "beautiful lady" was in fact an old daughter called Mademoiselle de La Merlière, a former nun. This claim gave rise to a curious lawsuit for defamation which the plaintiff (La Merlière) lost twice, at first instance on May 2, 1855 and on appeal on May 6, 1857., despite an eloquent plea by Jules Favre.

Abbé Cartellier and Abbé Deléon continued thereafter to publish pamphlets against the apparition. The cardinal-archbishop of Lyon, Louis Jacques Maurice de Bonald, was favorable to the two polemicists. The Papacy did not commit.

The basilica and the missionaries 

The first stone of a large church was solemnly laid on the mountain of La Salette, on 25 May 1852, in front of a large congregation of believers. This church, later promoted to the rank of basilica, was served by religious called missionaries of La Salette, who were replaced in 1891 by diocesan priests after their expulsion by exile laws.

Similarities with the "letter of Jesus Christ on Sunday" 

On 2 May 1847, the Censeur, an anticlerical newspaper from Lyon, attacked the apparition of La Salette and denounced those who "deceive the credulity of peasants by inventing miracles, such as the letters of Jesus Christ, the apparitions of angels and the Virgin".

These letters of Jesus Christ are variants of the Carta dominica, a New Testament apocryphon whose first known mention dates from around 584.

In such a "letter", seized in 1818 from a pedlar in the department of Isère, Christ says in particular: "Attacks (sins) so worthy of the most cruel punishments, are stopped by the prayers of the divine Mary my very dear Mother (...). I have given you six days to work, and the seventh to rest (...) but you make it a day to accomplish the works of the devil, such as gambling, drunkenness, blasphemy (...)." A similar document, seized from the same peddler, begins with these words: "Here is the hand of Our Lord Jesus Christ, which is ready to punish sinners" and then makes the Virgin say: "I can no longer stop the anger of my Son".

The Censeur of Lyon, as seen above, had mentioned the apparition of La Salette and the Letters of Jesus Christ in the same article, but had not compared the message of the apparition and the content of the Letters. This comparison was made in 1855 by a Belgian anticlerical author who signed "François-Joseph". He reproduces (after Voltaire) a version of the Letter of Jesus Christ allegedly fallen from heaven at Paimpol in 1771, which contains in particular the following words: "I warn you that, if you continue to live in sin (... ), I will make you feel the weight of my divine arm. If it weren't for my dear mother's prayers, I would have already destroyed the earth, for the sins you commit against one another. I have given you six days to work, and the seventh to rest, to sanctify my holy name, to hear holy mass, and to use the rest of the day in the service of God my father. On the contrary, we only see blasphemy and drunkenness (...)." The Letter of Jesus Christ being considered as apocryphal by the Church, François-Joseph concludes, from the similarities between this Letter and the speech of Our Lady of La Salette, that there are there two related impostures.

Father Hippolyte Delehaye, president of the Bollandist Society, expressed in 1928 an opinion similar to that of François-Joseph: "We will add that the famous question of the 'fact of La Salette' had could have been settled sooner and more easily if one had recognized in the words attributed to the Blessed Virgin one of the forms of the celestial letter, barely demarcated. (...) One has not even taken the trouble to arrange a text originally placed in the mouth of the Saviour, but which, pronounced by the Virgin, no longer makes sense: 'I gave you six days to work, I reserved the seventh for myself, and they don't want to give it me.' Particularly significant is the title given to the first draft, written on September 20, 1846, the very day after the event: 'Letter dictated by the Blessed Virgin to two children on the mountain of La Salette-Fallavaux.' We won't add any comments."

Pope John Paul II stated, "As I wrote on the occasion of the 150th anniversary, 'La Salette is a message of hope, for our hope is nourished by the intercession of her who is the Mother of mankind."

The secrets
No mention of secrets is made in the children's first accounts. The children later reported that the Blessed Virgin had confided a special secret to each of them. These two secrets, which neither Mélanie nor Maximin ever made known to each other, were sent by them in 1851 to Pope Pius IX on the advice of de Bruillard. It is assumed that these secrets were of a personal nature. Maximin advised the Marquise de Monteyard, "Ah, it is good fortune."

Fate of the children

"Maximin Giraud, after an unhappy and wandering life, returned to Corps, his native village, and died there a holy death (1 March 1875). Mélanie Calvat ended a no less wandering life at Altamura, Italy (15 December, 1904)."

Mélanie Calvat died as a Catholic nun at Altamura, Italy, on 15 December 1904.

Legacy

The Missionaries of Our Lady of La Salette were founded in 1852 by Philbert de Bruillard, Bishop of Grenoble, France, and presently serve in some 25 countries.

The U.S. National Shrine of Our Lady of La Salette is located in Attleboro, Massachusetts. Known simply as "La Salette" locally, it is famous for its Festival of Lights, held annually during the Christmas season, where the grounds are decorated with elaborate Christmas light displays. The shrine is visited by over 1 million people per year and hosts many pilgrimages and retreats throughout the year.

Bibliography 

 Jean Stern, La Salette. Documents authentiques, t. 1. Septembre 1846 - début mars 1847.  Ed. Desclée De Brouwer, 1980.
 Jean Stern, La Salette. Documents authentiques, t. 2. Fin mars 1847 - avril 1849. Paris, Les Éditions du Cerf; Corps, Association des Pèlerins de La Salette; 1984.
 Jean Stern, La Salette. Documents authentiques, t. 3. 1er mai 1849 - 4 novembre 1854. Paris, Les Éditions du Cerf; Corps, Association des Pèlerins de La Salette; 1991.

See also 
 Our Lady of Fátima
 Our Lady of Lourdes
 Visions of Jesus and Mary
 Léon Bloy § Our Lady of La Salette

References

External links
 Official Website
 The National Shrine of Our Lady of La Salette in Attleboro, MA
 Missionaries of La Salette vocations website
 The Secrets of La Salette English translation

 
Titles of Mary
Catholic devotions
La Salette
Shrines to the Virgin Mary
1846 in France
1846 in Christianity
Catholic Church in France